Synemosyna petrunkevitchi is a spider in the family Salticidae (jumping spiders).
The distribution range of Synemosyna petrunkevitchi includes the United States and Cuba.

References

Salticidae
Spiders described in 1922